Viscount Marchwood, of Penang and of Marchwood in the County of Southampton, is a title in the Peerage of the United Kingdom. It was created in 1945 for the businessman and Conservative politician Frederick Penny, 1st Baron Marchwood. He had already been created a baronet, of Marchwood in the county of Southampton, in the Baronetage of the United Kingdom on 19 June 1933, and Baron Marchwood, of Penang and of Marchwood in the County of Southampton, in 1937, also in the peerage of the United Kingdom.

 the titles are held by his great-grandson, the fourth Viscount, who succeeded his father in that year. The third Viscount was educated at Winchester College and served in the Royal Horse Guards, before a career in the drinks industry, first at Cadbury Schweppes, then as managing director of Moet et Chandon.

The family seat was The Filberts in Aston Tirrold, Berkshire (now Oxfordshire).

Viscounts Marchwood (1945)
Frederick George Penny, 1st Viscount Marchwood (1876–1955)
Peter George Penny, 2nd Viscount Marchwood (1912–1979)
David George Staveley Penny, 3rd Viscount Marchwood (1936–2022)
Peter George Worsley Penny, 4th Viscount Marchwood (b. 1965)

The heir apparent is the present holder’s only son Hon. Christopher (Kit) David George Penny (b. 1999)

Line of succession

  Frederick George Penny, 1st Viscount Marchwood (1876–1955)
  Peter George Penny, 2nd Viscount Marchwood (1912–1979)
  David George Staveley Penny, 3rd Viscount Marchwood (1936–2022)
  Peter George Worsley Penny, 4th Viscount Marchwood (b. 1965)
 (1) Hon. Christopher David George Penny (b. 1999)
 (2) Hon. Nicholas Mark Staveley Penny (b. 1967)
 (3) Hon. Edward James Frederick Penny (b. 1970)
 (4) Alexander George Robert Penny (b. 1997)

Notes

References
Kidd, Charles, Williamson, David (editors). Debrett's Peerage and Baronetage (1990 edition). New York: St Martin's Press, 1990,

External links

Viscountcies in the Peerage of the United Kingdom
Noble titles created in 1945
People from Aston Tirrold
Noble titles created for UK MPs